Moonshine is a South Korean television series starring Yoo Seung-ho, Lee Hye-ri, Byeon Woo-seok, and Kang Mi-na. It tells the story of four young people as they grow up, form friendships and fall in love during the era of strict alcohol prohibition. It aired from December 20, 2021 to February 22, 2022, on KBS2's Mondays and Tuesdays at 21:30 (KST) time slot for 16 episodes.

Synopsis
It depicts human love and desire during the period of the strictest alcohol prohibition law in Joseon history.

Cast

Main
 Yoo Seung-ho as Nam Young, a passionate and good-looking inspector of the Ministry of Patriots and Constitutional Affairs who left his hometown to achieve fame in Hanyang and restore his family's honor.
 Jung Hyeon-jun as young Nam Young
 Lee Hye-ri as Kang Ro-seo, a poor aristocrat's daughter who is the family's breadwinner. She is hard-working and does all types of jobs to make money. She secretly begins brewing liquor to pay off her debts.
 Byeon Woo-seok as Lee Pyo, the rebellious crown prince who often sneaks out of the palace to have a drink even in a time of prohibition, causing nuisance for the kingdom.
 Kang Mi-na as Han Ae-jin, the only daughter of a noble family who is straightforward and stubborn. She is transparent about her dislikes and absolutely must do what she wants.
 Choi Won-young as Lee Si-heum, Lee Pyo's uncle who is an ambitious and mysterious person.
 Jang Gwang as Yeon Jo-mun, a powerful man who directly placed the King on the throne.

Supporting

People around Nam Young
 Kim Ki-bang as Chun-gae
 Im Won-hee as Hwang-ga
 Lee Si-hoon as Kim Seok-won
 Im Cheol-hyung as Nam Tae-ho

People around Kang Ro-seo
 Seo Ye-hwa as Seo Hye-min / Cheon Geum
 Bae Yu-ram as Kang Hae-soo

People around Lee Pyo
 Jung Sung-il as King Lee Kang
 Ahn Si-ha as Lee Kyung-bin
 Kim Min-ho as Kim Eol-dong

People in the night street
  as Shim Heon
 Park Ah-in as Woon Shim
 Hong Wan-pyo as Gye Sang-mok
 Lee Ha-nee as Jung-mok
 Shin Hee-chul as Ha-mok
 Lee Ki-taek as Tae-seon
 Kim Ji-an as Ok-ran

People in the palace
  as Yeon Jung-jeon
 Lee Hwang-ui as Han Sang-woon
 Han Soo-hyun as Yeon Chae-bong
 Kim Jae-rok as Yeon Gi-bong
 Shin Hyun-jong as Jo Hee-bo
 Song Duk-ho as Jo Ji-soo

Extended
 Jung Young-joo
 Park Seong-hyun as Kang San / Mak San
 Lee Chae-kyung as Jo Haeng-soo

Special appearances
 Park Eun-seok as Seong-hyeon, Lee Pyo's half-brother.
 Hwang Bo-ra as a woman who captures the attention of Hwang-ga.

Production
Filming was scheduled to begin in May 2021.

Original soundtrack

Part 1

Part 2

Part 3

Part 4

Part 5

Part 6

Part 7

Part 8

Part 9

Viewership

Notes

References

External links
  
 
 
 

Korean-language television shows
Korean Broadcasting System television dramas
South Korean romance television series
South Korean historical television series
Television series set in the Joseon dynasty
Television series by Monster Union
2021 South Korean television series debuts
2022 South Korean television series endings
Wavve original programming